The following is a list of South Korean girl groups.

Generation 1 (1997–2002)

Other girl groups 

 Chakra 
 Cleo 
 Diva 
 Jewelry 
 Kiss 
 Luv 
 M.I.L.K. 
 Papaya 
 Shinvi 
 Sugar 
 T.T.Ma

Generation 2 (2003–2011)

Other girl groups 

 Big Mama 
 Black Pearl 
 Blady 
 C-REAL 
 Chocolat 
 Dal Shabet 
 F-ve Dolls 
 Gavy NJ 
 Girl Friends 
 GP Basic 
 The Grace 
 JQT 
 LPG 
 Nine Muses 
 Rainbow 
 Rania 
 SeeYa 
 Skarf 
 Stellar 
 Sorea Band 
 Sunny Hill

Generation 3 (2012–2017)

Other girl groups 

 2Eyes 
 4L 
 4Ten 
 April 
 Alice 
 Badkiz 
 The Barberettes 
 Berry Good 
 Bestie 
 Busters 
 Bob Girls 
 CLC 
 Crayon Pop 
 D-Unit 
 D.Holic 
 DIA 
 Dreamcatcher 
 EvoL 
 Favorite 
 Fiestar 
 Gangkiz 
 GI 
 Glam 
 Gugudan 
 HashTag 
 Hello Venus 
 I.B.I 
 Laboum 
 Ladies' Code 
 Laysha 
 Lip Service 
 Loona 
 Lovelyz 
 MyB 
 Melody Day 
 P.O. 
 Playback 
 Pristin 
 Pungdeng-E 
 Puretty 
 Sonamoo 
 Spica 
 S.I.S 
 She'z 
 Tahiti 
 Tiny-G 
 Two X 
 Unicorn 
 Wassup 
 Weki Meki 
 WJSN 
 Year 7 Class 1

Generation 4 (since 2018)

Other girl groups 

 3YE 
 Ariaz 
 Billlie 
 Blackswan 
 BugAboo 
 Bvndit 
 Cherry Bullet 
 Cignature 
 Classy 
 CSR 
 DreamNote 
 Everglow 
 Fanatics 
 Fifty Fifty 
 Fromis 9 
 Girlkind 
 GWSN 
 H1-Key 
 Hinapia 
 Honey Popcorn 
 Hot Issue 
 Ichillin' 
 ILY:1 
 Irris 
 Lapillus 
 Lightsum 
 Lunarsolar 
 Maywish 
 Mimiirose 
 Nature 
 NeonPunch 
 Pink Fantasy 
 Pixy 
 Purple Kiss 
 Purplebeck 
 Redsquare 
 Rocket Punch 
 Saturday 
 Secret Number 
 Tri.be 
 TripleS 
 Uni.T 
 Viviz 
 Weeekly 
 We Girls 
 Woo!ah!

See also 
 List of South Korean idol groups
 List of South Korean boy bands

Notes

References 

 
Lists of women in music
Lists of South Korean women